Tower College is an English independent non-denominational Christian school for boys and girls aged 3–16.

History 
The school is named after the main school building, the former private residence, The Tower, on Mill Lane, Rainhill near Prescot, Merseyside. 

Designed in free Jacobethan style and built in 1880 for the Henry Baxter family, the main building’s exterior features balustrades, parapets, and high Elizabethan style chimneys. The interior has an impressive main stair hall with stained glass windows and many wood paneled rooms in Jacobean style with decorative ceilings. The Tower operated as a war hospital during World War I. In 2006, the main school building was considered for listed status, but the inspection found too many original features had been altered since its adaptation as a hospital and school.  

Charles and Muriel Oxley bought The Tower and established the school in 1948. While continuing to operate Tower College, Oxley later established two other schools, Scarisbrick Hall School, near Ormskirk in 1964, and Hamilton College, in Lanarkshire in 1983. After Charles and Muriel Oxley died, their daughter, Rachel Oxley, became Principal. As of 2022, Tower College’s principal is Andrea Bingley.

Curriculum 
The school has a broad curriculum covering all major subjects, together with specialist sport, music and languages teaching. Extracurricular activities include choir, instrument ensembles, performing arts and sports. Exam results at Tower College are often above the local and national averages.

Reputation 
Tower College aims to have clear and transparent communication with parents.

With the challenges of the 2020-21 pandemic, the school invested in online learning where teachers offer live online lessons and a ‘virtual exam hall’, where invigilation can be conducted by teachers via zoom, a development widely reported in national media.

Aside from public examinations, students take part in competitive music, squash, tennis and public speaking. Students take part in the Rotary Club of St Helens public speaking competition and have represented the region in the ‘Youth Speaks’ competition.

Also known for charity fundraising, Tower College holds fundraising events throughout the school. This has included raising money for the local Willowbrook Hospice in Eccleston Park.

References

External links 
Official Website

Private schools in St Helens, Merseyside
Educational institutions established in 1948
Member schools of the Independent Schools Association (UK)
1948 establishments in England